The Saskatchewan Rugby Football Union was a Canadian football league created on September 22, 1910 and disbanded after the 1936 season.  It joined the Manitoba Rugby Football Union and the Alberta Rugby Football Union to form the Western Canada Rugby Football Union in 1911.

The Union had been preceded, in 1907, by the Saskatchewan Rugby Football League.

Teams

Moose Jaw Maroons - 1928 to 1932
Moose Jaw Millers - 1919 to 1921 & 1927 & 1933 to 1934 & 1936
Moose Jaw Robin Hoods - 1913 to 1915  
Moose Jaw Tigers - 1910 to 1913
Regina Boat Club - 1920 to 1922 
Regina Rugby Club + Roughriders - 1910 to 1936
Saskatoon Quakers - 1920 to 1925 & 1929 to 1932
Saskatoon Hilltops - 1933 to 1936
Saskatoon Rugby Club - 1911 to 1919
University of Saskatchewan Varsity - 1913 to 1922 & 1925 & 1932 to 1935

SRFU Champions

 1907   Moose Jaw Tigers (in Saskatchewan Rugby Football League)
 1908   Regina YMCA (in Saskatchewan Rugby Football League)
 1910   Moose Jaw Tigers
 1911   Regina Rugby Club
 1912   Regina Rugby Club
 1913   Regina Rugby Club
 1914   Regina Rugby Club
 1915   Regina Rugby Club
 1916   Regina Rugby Club 
 1917  World War I
 1918  World War I
 1919  Regina Rugby Club
 1920  Regina Rugby Club
 1921  Saskatoon Quakers
 1922  Regina Rugby Club
 1923  Regina Rugby Club
 1924 Regina Roughriders
 1925  Regina Roughriders
 1926  Regina Roughriders
 1927  Regina Roughriders
 1928  suspended play for Tri-City Rugby Football League (won by the Regina Roughriders)
 1929  Regina Roughriders
 1930  Regina Roughriders
 1931  Regina Roughriders
 1932  Regina Roughriders
 1933  Regina Roughriders
 1934  Regina Roughriders
 1935  Regina Roughriders
 1936  Moose Jaw Millers

Totals
23 - Regina Rugby Club + Roughriders
1 - Moose Jaw Tigers
1 - Saskatoon Quakers
1 - Moose Jaw Millers

References

http://cflapedia.com/
http://www.riderville.com/
https://web.archive.org/web/20120918120434/http://www.cfl.ca/page/his_teams_sask

Defunct rugby union leagues in Canada
Defunct Canadian football leagues